Ultimate Santana is a compilation by rock band Santana, combining hits from recent albums Supernatural, Shaman and All That I Am with early classics. Amongst the 18 tracks there are three new recordings. This album was made possible when Sony Music Entertainment (parent of Columbia Records) merged with BMG (parent of Arista) to form Sony BMG (Sony later bought BMG's share, subsequently reforming SME).

On November 3, 2007, the album debuted at number eight on the U.S. Billboard 200 chart, selling about 56,000 copies in its first week.

Track listings
Credits adapted from the liner notes of Ultimate Santana.

 signifies a co-producer
 signifies an additional vocal producer

Personnel
 Vocals – Everlast, Jennifer Lopez, Alex Band, Mana, Michelle Branch, Rob Thomas, Steven Tyler, Baby Bash, The Product G&B, Tina Turner, Greg Walker 
 Carlos Santana – lead, acoustic and electric guitar, lead & back vocals 
 Chad Kroeger – guitar + vocals
 Everlast - rhythm guitar and vocals
 Neal Schon – guitar
 Rick Nowels - acoustic guitar
 Rusty Anerson - additional electric guitar
 Karl Perazzo – electric guitar, bass guitar
 David Brown  – bass guitar
 Rodney Rietveld - bass guitar
 David Morgan - bass guitar
 Chester D. Thompson – Hammond B3 organ, piano 
 David Delgado – Hammond B3 organ, keyboards
 Gregg Rolie – keyboards
 Rodney Holmes - drums
 Graham Lear - drums
 Michael Carabello – congas
 Raul Rekow - congas, percussions
 Karl Perazzo - percussions
 Carlo Steele - percussions
 Pete Escovedo - percussions
 Luis Conte - additional percussions
 Joseph Chepitos Areas - timbales
 Jeremy Cohan - violin
 Daniel Seidenberg, Hari Balakrisnan - viola 
 Joseph Herbert - cello 
 Jeff Cressman, Marty Wehner - trombone 
 Bill Ortiz, Julius Melendez - trumpet

Charts

Weekly charts

Year-end charts

Certifications

References

 Ultimate Santana : https://www.discogs.com/fr/Santana-Ultimate-Santana/release/2954419

External links
 Official website
 Album review

2007 compilation albums
Albums produced by Dante Ross
Albums produced by Clive Davis
Albums produced by Cory Rooney
Santana (band) compilation albums
Arista Records compilation albums
Columbia Records compilation albums
Albums produced by John Gamble (record producer)